Alireza Kamali is a paralympic athlete from Iran competing mainly in category F58 discus throw events.

Kamali competed in the 2004 Summer Paralympics in Athens where he finished third in the F58 discus.

References

External links
 

Paralympic athletes of Iran
Athletes (track and field) at the 2004 Summer Paralympics
Paralympic bronze medalists for Iran
Living people
Medalists at the 2004 Summer Paralympics
Year of birth missing (living people)
Paralympic medalists in athletics (track and field)
Iranian male discus throwers
21st-century Iranian people